Amendment 52 was a proposed 2008 ballot initiative in Colorado, United States for around half of severance tax funds to be redirected to highway building and maintenance projects, especially expanding Interstate 70 in Colorado (I-70). 64.3% of the voters voted against it, so it did not go into effect.

Results

Conflict with Amendment 58
Both Amendment 58 and Amendment 52 appeared on the ballot in 2008, and they both regarded the handling of Colorado's use of the severance tax. While 58 would have allocated the money into college scholarships and natural resources, 52 would have redirected the money into improving I-70. Neither initiative passed.

References 

Amendment 52
Initiatives in the United States
Constitution of Colorado